Campus Maps is a mobile navigation service available at 100 universities in the US. Campus Maps was first released for iOS in August 2011.

History

Features
Campus Maps features One Tap Navigation, Satellite Mode, and Street View.

Release
On  Campus Maps released version 1.0, which contained the University of Maryland.

On  Campus Maps released version 2.0, which added search.

On  Campus Maps released version 3.0, which contained 100 schools.

References

External links
  – official site

IOS software